A forensic science laboratory is a scientific laboratory specialising in forensic science. Such laboratories may be run by private companies or the government but are often associated with the law enforcement infrastructure of a country.

See also
Forensic Science Service

References

External links 

Forensic facilities
Laboratory types